Neo Makama (born 17 March 1981) is a Mosotho footballer who plays as a striker. Since 2008, he has won four caps for the Lesotho national football team.

External links
 

Association football forwards
Lesotho footballers
Lesotho international footballers
1981 births
Living people
Lesotho expatriate footballers
Expatriate soccer players in South Africa
Orlando Pirates F.C. players
Lesotho expatriate sportspeople in South Africa